Rough 'n' Tumble is an album by jazz saxophonist Stanley Turrentine issued in 1966 on Blue Note Records.
The album reached No. 20 on the Billboard Top Soul Albums chart.

Overview
Rough and Tumble was produced by Alfred Lion and arranged by Duke Pearson.
Artists such as Blue Mitchell, James Spaulding, Pepper Adams, McCoy Tyner, Grant Green, Bob Cranshaw, and Mickey Roker performed upon the album.

Reception

The Allmusic review by Jason Elias awarded the album 3 stars and states "the star of the show is Turrentine, and his warmth and playing make this a necessity, especially for fans '60s pre-funk Blue Note jazz".

Track listing
 "And Satisfy" (Ronnell Bright) - 6:48
 "What Could I Do Without You" (Ray Charles) - 4:35
 "Feeling Good" (Newley, Bricusse) - 7:15
 "Shake" (Sam Cooke) - 5:55
 "Walk On By" (Bacharach, David) - 5:57
 "Baptismal" (John Hines) - 6:39

Personnel
Stanley Turrentine - tenor saxophone
Blue Mitchell - trumpet
James Spaulding - alto saxophone
Pepper Adams - baritone saxophone
McCoy Tyner - piano
Grant Green - guitar
Bob Cranshaw - bass, electric bass
Mickey Roker - drums
Duke Pearson - arranger

Production
 Alfred Lion - producer
 Rudy Van Gelder - engineer

Charts

References

1966 albums
Stanley Turrentine albums
Blue Note Records albums
Albums arranged by Duke Pearson
Albums produced by Alfred Lion
Albums recorded at Van Gelder Studio